German submarine U-363 was a Type VIIC U-boat of Nazi Germany's Kriegsmarine during World War II. The submarine was laid down on 23 December 1941 at the Flensburger Schiffbau-Gesellschaft yard at Flensburg as yard number 482, launched on 17 December 1942 and commissioned on 18 March 1943 under the command of Oberleutnant zur See Wolf-Werner Wilzer.

During her career, the U-boat sailed on seven combat patrols, but sank no ships before she surrendered at Narvik on 9 May 1945. She was sunk on 31 December 1945 as part of Operation Deadlight.

She was a member of eight wolfpacks.

Design
German Type VIIC submarines were preceded by the shorter Type VIIB submarines. U-363 had a displacement of  when at the surface and  while submerged. She had two shafts and two  propellers.

U-363 was fitted with five  torpedo tubes (four fitted at the bow and one at the stern), fourteen torpedoes, one  SK C/35 naval gun, 220 rounds, and two twin  C/30 anti-aircraft guns. The boat had a complement of between forty-four and sixty.

Service history
The boat's service life began with training with the 8th U-boat Flotilla on 18 March 1943. She was transferred to the 11th flotilla for operations on 1 June 1944. She was then reassigned to the 13th flotilla on 15 September.

She made a pair of short voyages from Kiel in Germany to Marvika and Bergen in Norway in May 1944.

First, second and third patrols
The submarine's first patrol began with her departure from Bergen on 29 May 1944. She arrived at Bogenbucht (west of Narvik) on 29 June but departed again on 4 August. She finished her second patrol back at Narvik on 2 September 1944.

U-363 spent her third sortie in the Norwegian Sea.

Fourth, fifth and sixth patrols
Her fourth foray took her past the North Cape and into the Barents Sea.

For her fifth patrol, she sailed as far as the Kola Inlet, (the entrance to Murmansk).

Patrol number six was preceded by trips between Narvik, Trondheim and Kilbotn, (northwest of Narvik).

Seventh patrol and fate
U-363s last patrol in April and May 1945 was followed by moves to Skjomenfjord and following the German capitulation, Lerwick and Loch Eriboll in Scotland in preparation for Operation Deadlight.

References

Bibliography

External links

German Type VIIC submarines
U-boats commissioned in 1943
U-boats sunk in 1945
World War II submarines of Germany
1942 ships
Ships built in Flensburg
Operation Deadlight
Maritime incidents in December 1945